Peter Pulay (born September 20, 1941, in Veszprém, Hungary) is a theoretical chemist. He is the Roger B. Bost Distinguished Professor of Chemistry in the Department of Chemistry and Biochemistry at the University of Arkansas, United States.

One of his most important contributions is the introduction of the gradient method in quantum chemistry. This allows the prediction of the geometric structure of a molecule using computational chemical programs to be almost routine. He is the main author of the PQS computational chemistry program.

His work was cited in the official background material for the 1998 Nobel Prize in chemistry.

Among many honors, he was made a Foreign Member of the Hungarian Academy of Sciences in 1993. He is a member of the International Academy of Quantum Molecular Science.

See also
Direct inversion in the iterative subspace
Pulay stress

References
 University of Arkansas Faculty Page for Peter Pulay 
 Peter Pulay's International Academy of Quantum Molecular Science page

Living people
Members of the International Academy of Quantum Molecular Science
1941 births
Schrödinger Medal recipients
Computational chemists